Walhonding is an unincorporated community in northern Newcastle Township, Coshocton County, Ohio, United States.  It has a post office with the ZIP code 43843.  It lies at the intersection of State Routes 206 and 715.

History
Walhonding was platted in 1841, when construction of the Walhonding Canal reached that point. A post office called Walhonding has been in operation since 1839.

References

Unincorporated communities in Ohio
Unincorporated communities in Coshocton County, Ohio
Populated places established in 1841
1841 establishments in Ohio